The 1993 Cleveland mayoral election took place on November 2, 1993, to elect the Mayor of Cleveland, Ohio. It saw the reelection of Michael R. White to a second consecutive term. The election was officially nonpartisan.

White faced only token opposition.

General election

References

1990s in Cleveland
Cleveland mayoral
Cleveland
Mayoral elections in Cleveland
Non-partisan elections
November 1993 events in the United States